The Network of War Collections (NOB) is a partnership of over 250 archival institutions, museums, remembrance centers and libraries in the Kingdom of the Netherlands, the former Dutch colonial empire, and internationally to bring together scattered collections of resources pertaining to World War II. The network is financed by the Ministry of Health, Welfare and Sport and receives a contribution from the National Fund for Peace, Freedom and Veteran Care.

The  12 million sources of information accumulated by the NOB include artifacts, original photographs, diaries, newspaper articles, films, letters, brochures, and posters, which are sorted into themes of resistance, captivity, collaboration, life under German and Japanese occupations, liberation, warfare, international events, The Holocaust and persecution, the lead-up to and aftermath of WWII, and the Indonesian War of Independence.

Oorlogsbronnen.nl 
Facilitated by the NIOD Institute for War, Holocaust and Genocide Studies, the digital archive  of the Network of War Collections was launched on 10 November 2011. The website uses search technology developed by the Utrecht-based Spinque and is designed by DOOR (IN10) from Rotterdam.

Notable partners 
A selection of organizations who have partnered with the Network of War Collections are:
 Airborne Museum 'Hartenstein'
 Amsterdam City Archives
 Amsterdam Museum
 Anne Frank Foundation
 Arolsen Archives - International Center on Nazi Persecution
 Atria Institute on gender equality and women's history
 Camp Vught National Memorial
 Camp Westerbork Memorial Center
 CBG Centrum voor familiegeschiedenis
 Freedom Museum
 Historisch Centrum Leeuwarden
 IHLIA LGBT Heritage
 International Institute of Social History
 Joods Historisch Museum
 Leo Smit Foundation
 Maritime Museum Rotterdam
 Museum Maluku
 Museon
 Nationaal Archief
 National Committee for 4 and 5 May
 National Monument Kamp Amersfoort
 National Monument Oranjehotel
 Natura Artis Magistra
 Netherlands Institute for Sound and Vision
 Netherlands Music Institute
 Railway Museum
 Rijksdienst voor het Cultureel Erfgoed
 Rijksmuseum
 Royal Library of the Netherlands
 Spaarnestad Photo
 Tresoar
 Utrecht Archives
 Verzetsmuseum

References

External links

  (in Dutch)
 NIOD Institute for War, Holocaust and Genocide Studies

2011 establishments in the Netherlands
Archives in the Netherlands
Historiography of the Netherlands
Historiography of World War II
History organisations based in the Netherlands
Holocaust historiography
Indonesian National Revolution
Open-access archives
Projects established in 2011